Body Heat is the second album by German music group Blue System, released in 1988.

There were 4 single releases from this album: "My Bed Is Too Big" was released in April 1988, "Under My Skin" in October 1988, "Silent Water" in December 1988 and "Love Suite" (Remix '89) in April 1989.

Track listing
   "Under My Skin" – 3:31 
   "Do You Wanna Be My Girlfriend" – 3:55 
   "Titanic 650604" – 3:23 
   "Love Suite" – 3:17 
   "Body Heat" – 3:04 
   "My Bed Is Too Big" – 3:13 
   "Too Young" – 3:39 
   "Sorry Little Sarah" (New York Dance Mix) – 5:56 
   "Silent Water" – 3:34 
   "I Want to Be Your Brother" – 3:12

Personnel
 Dieter Bohlen –  lead vocals, chorus, producer, arranger, lyrics
 Rolf Köhler – refrain vocals, chorus
 Detlef Wiedeke – chorus
 Michael Scholz – chorus
 Luis Rodrigues – co-producer

External links

Blue System albums
1988 albums
Hansa Records albums